M. gigas  may refer to:
 Marginellona gigas, a deepwater sea snail species 
 Mawsonia gigas, an extinct fish species
 Manospondylus gigas, the original name for Tyrannosaurus rex
 Meraxes gigas, a giant predatory dinosaur with short arms like Tyrannosaurus rex

See also
 Gigas (disambiguation)